Leslie "Les" Blair (born 23 October 1941, Manchester, England) is a BAFTA winning television, film and theatre director.

Gaining notoriety for his controversial mini-series Law And Order (shown in 1978 on BBC2), Blair has gone on to direct films characterised by their political and social awareness.

Blair graduated from and currently teaches at London Film School. In 2019, he was made Honorary Associate of London Film School.

Filmography
Blooming Youth (BBC Play for Today, 1973) (TV)
Bet Your Life (BBC Play for Today, 1976) (TV)
Law And Order (1978) (TV)
Only A Game (1981) (TV)
The Nation's Health (1983) (TV)
Number One (1985)
Honest Decent And True (1986) (TV)
London's Burning: The Movie (1986) (TV)
Leave To Remain (1988) (TV)
The Accountant (1989)
News Hounds (1990) (TV)
Filipina Dreamgirls (1991)
Tracey Ullman: A Class Act (1992) (TV)
Bad Behaviour (1993)
Merrihill Millionaires (1993) (TV)
Bliss (1995) (TV)
Jump the Gun (1997)
Stand And Deliver (1998) (TV)
H3 (2001)

External links
 

1941 births
Living people
English television directors
Film directors from London
Mass media people from Manchester
Alumni of the London Film School